

A cross necklace is any necklace featuring a Christian cross or crucifix.

Crosses are often worn as an indication of commitment to the Christian faith, and are sometimes received as gifts for rites such as baptism and confirmation. Communicants of the Oriental Orthodox and Eastern Orthodox Churches are expected to wear their baptismal cross necklaces at all times, a practice derived from Canon 73 and Canon 82 of the Sixth Ecumenical Council (Synod) of Constantinople.

Some Christians believe that the wearing of a cross offers protection from evil, while others, Christian and non-Christian, wear cross necklaces as a fashion accessory.

"In the first centuries of the Christian era,  the cross was a clandestine symbol used by the persecuted adherents of the new religion." Many Christian bishops of various denominations, such as the Orthodox Church, wear a pectoral cross as a sign of their order.

Most adherents of the Ethiopian Orthodox Tewahedo Church will wear a cross attached to either a chain or a matäb, a silk cord.  The matäb is tied about the neck at the time of baptism, and the recipient is expected to wear the matäb at all times. Women will often affix a cross or other pendant to the matäb, but this is not considered essential.

In some nations, such as the People's Socialist Republic of Albania, an atheist state, the wearing of cross necklaces was historically banned.

Some denominations, like Jehovah's Witnesses, believe wearing a cross is forbidden by commandments against idolatry.

In two highly publicised British cases, nurse Shirley Chaplin and British Airways flight attendant Nadia Eweida were disciplined for wearing cross necklaces at work, in breach of their employment terms. Both took their cases to the European Court of Human Rights; Chaplin's case was dismissed, while Eweida was awarded damages on the grounds that the UK government had failed to weigh her right to religious expression heavily enough. In light of such cases, in 2012 the former archbishop of Canterbury of the Anglican Communion, Lord Carey of Clifton, and then head of the Roman Catholic Church in Scotland, Cardinal Keith O'Brien, have urged all Christians to wear cross necklaces regularly.

Gallery

References

External links
On Wearing of The Cross (Greek Orthodox Christian Perspective)
Explanation on Wearing Cross Necklaces (Russian Orthodox Christian Perspective)

Christian religious objects
Pendant crosses
Lucky symbols
Amulets